Marina Damlaimcourt Uceda (born 15 October 1979 in Madrid) is a Spanish professional triathlete, National Triathlon Champion of the year 2008, three times National Aquathlon Champion (2004, 2005, 2010), and member of the National Team.

Marina Damlaimcourt is no. 3 in the Spanish High Performance ranking of the year 2010 (DAR = Deportistas Alto Rendimiento FETRI 2010), and belongs to the high performance centre Centro Alto Rendimiento (CAR) Madrid.

In the eight years from 2003 to 2010, Damlaimcourt has taken part in 46 ITU elite competitions and has achieved 10 top ten positions. At her very first ITU triathlon (Schliersee) Damlaimcourt won the gold medal.

In 2008 and 2009, Marina Damlaimcourt also took part in the prestigious French Club Championship Series Lyonnasise des Eaux representing Poissy Triathlon: in Paris (22 June 2008), Beauvais (6 July 2008), and at the Grand Final in La Baule (21 September 2008) she placed 4th, 9th, and 11th respectively, and in Beauvais (21 June 2009) and Tours (19 July 2010) she placed 9th and 11th.

Damlaimcourt lives in Galapagar, Madrid, and in Spain she represents the club Canal de Isabel II.

ITU Competitions 

Unless indicated otherwise the following competitions are triathlons and belong to the Elite category. The following list is based upon the official ITU rankings and the athlete's ITU Profile Page.

BG = the sponsor British Gas · DNF = did not finish · DNS = did not start

External links
 Spanish Triathlon Federation in Spanish

Notes

Spanish female triathletes
Sportspeople from Madrid
Living people
1979 births
Triathletes at the 2012 Summer Olympics
Olympic triathletes of Spain
Athletes from the Community of Madrid
20th-century Spanish women
21st-century Spanish women